Erik Joakimsson Fleming (1487–1548) was Finnish noble, a Councilor of State of Sweden and an admiral. He was a prominent statesman and King Gustav Vasa's favourite. He was the king's trusted official in Swedish Finland. 

Fleming was son of the riksråd nobleman Joakim Fleming and Elin Björnsdotter of Svidja, and the brother of abbess Valborg Fleming and Ivar Fleming: he was a grandson of Björn Ragvaldsson's. Erik Fleming's son was Admiral Klaus Fleming.

From 1512, he had a number of offices within the government administration in Finland. In 1523, him and his brother was named riksråd by king Gustav, and came to be his trusted representatives in Finland, then a Swedish province.

References
 Erik Fleming i Svenskt biografiskt lexikon

1487 births
1548 deaths
Finnish politicians
15th-century Finnish nobility
16th-century Finnish nobility
16th-century Swedish politicians
Swedish royal favourites
Swedish admirals